Piyaphong Pathammavong (born 8 September 1998)  is a Laotian footballer who plays as a defender.

References 

Living people
1998 births
Laotian footballers
Laos international footballers
Association football defenders